Serena Williams was the two-time defending champion, but withdrew before the tournament began due to injury.

Angelique Kerber was in contention for the world No. 1 ranking, which she would have attained had she won the title. However, by losing in the final she remained No. 2. 

Karolína Plíšková won her sixth WTA singles title, defeating Kerber in the final, 6–3, 6–1.

The two would play each other three weeks later, in the final of the US Open. Having already claimed the No. 1 ranking following Williams' defeat in the semifinals, Kerber avenged her loss by beating Plíšková in three sets.

Seeds
All seeds received a bye into the second round.

Draw

Finals

Top half

Section 1

Section 2

Bottom half

Section 3

Section 4

Qualifying

Seeds

Qualifiers

Lucky losers

Qualifying draw

First qualifier

Second qualifier

Third qualifier

Fourth qualifier

Fifth qualifier

Sixth qualifier

Seventh qualifier

Eighth qualifier

Ninth qualifier

Tenth qualifier

Eleventh qualifier

Twelfth qualifier

References

Qualifying Draw

External links

Western and Southern Open
2016 Western & Southern Open